Fuchsia Swing Song is the debut album by American saxophonist Sam Rivers recorded in 1964 and released on the Blue Note label. The album was reissued on CD in 1995, and again in 2003 as part of the "Connoisseur Series" (limited edition series) including four alternate takes as bonus tracks.

Reception
The Allmusic review by Thom Jurek awarded the album 4½ stars and stated "By the time of his debut, Rivers had been deep under the influence of Coltrane and [Ornette] Coleman, but wasn't willing to give up the blues just yet. Hence the sound on Fuchsia Swing Song is one of an artist who is at once very self-assured, and in transition... This is a highly recommended date. Rivers never played quite like this again".

Track listing
All compositions by Sam Rivers.

 "Fuchsia Swing Song" – 6:03
 "Downstairs Blues Upstairs" – 5:33
 "Cyclic Episode" – 6:57
 "Luminous Monolith" – 6:31
 "Beatrice" – 6:13
 "Ellipsis" – 7:43

Bonus tracks on CD reissue:
"Luminous Monolith" [Alternate Take] – 6:39
 "Downstairs Blues Upstairs" [First Alternate Take] – 8:09
 "Downstairs Blues Upstairs" [Second Alternate Take] – 7:47
 "Downstairs Blues Upstairs" [Third Alternate Take] – 7:49

Personnel
Sam Rivers – tenor saxophone
Jaki Byard – piano
Ron Carter – bass
Tony Williams – drums

References

Blue Note Records albums
Sam Rivers (jazz musician) albums
1965 debut albums
Albums recorded at Van Gelder Studio
Albums produced by Alfred Lion